Chief Mporokoso (also spelled 'Mpolokoso' and 'Mumpolokoso') is a senior chieftainship of the Bemba people of Zambia, and a subordinate chief of Paramount Chief Chitimukulu. The chief's palace is located in the Northern Province town of Mporokoso named after the chieftainship.

Notes

Traditional rulers in Zambia
Living people
Bemba
Year of birth missing (living people)